Fox Point 157D is an Indian reserve of the Lac La Ronge Indian Band in Saskatchewan. It is 16 miles south-east of La Ronge, and on the south-west shore of Lac la Ronge.

References

Indian reserves in Saskatchewan
Division No. 18, Saskatchewan